Taperamyia is a genus of parasitic flies in the family Tachinidae. There is one described species in Taperamyia, T. pickeli.

Distribution
Brazil

References

Dexiinae
Diptera of South America
Monotypic Brachycera genera
Tachinidae genera
Taxa named by Charles Henry Tyler Townsend